Steven Ho Chun-yin, BBS (born 30 November 1979), is a member of the Legislative Council of Hong Kong. He represents the functional constituency for Agriculture and Fisheries. He belongs to the Democratic Alliance for the Betterment and Progress of Hong Kong party.

Background
Ho graduated from University of Birmingham in Communication and Computer System Engineering. He became a member of the Election Committee for Agriculture and Fisheries constituency. Ho was elected in the Legislative Council of Hong Kong as the successor for Wong Yung-kan in 2012 legislative election and retained the seat in the 2016 election.

In February 2021, Ho attacked RTHK, and accused it of spreading "fake news" and slandering the police.

In March 2021, after learning that the Huanggang Port would cost Hong Kong only HK$1,000 a year, with the rest of the costs handled by Shenzhen, Ho said that Hong Kong should pay more and that "We should pay what we should be paying, instead of just taking advantage of them."

On 30 June 2022, Ho was pictured along with CCP general secretary Xi Jinping and other government officials. His COVID-19 test from that day was negative, but was classified as uncertain on his 1 July 2022 test, and positive on his test on 2 July 2022.

References

1979 births
Living people
Democratic Alliance for the Betterment and Progress of Hong Kong politicians
HK LegCo Members 2012–2016
HK LegCo Members 2016–2021
HK LegCo Members 2022–2025
Alumni of the University of Birmingham
Members of the Election Committee of Hong Kong, 2012–2017
Recipients of the Bronze Bauhinia Star